Victor Malka (born 1960 in Casablanca, Morocco) is a French plasma physicist and a pioneer in laser plasma acceleration. In 2004, Malka demonstrated that high energy monoenergetic electron beams could be generated using the technique of laser wakefield acceleration, and subsequently used them to develop compact X-ray and gamma radiation sources with applications in medicine, security technology and phase-contrast imaging.

Early life and career 

Malka came from a Jewish family in Morocco and came to France at the age of six, where he grew up in Marseille and in the Parisian suburbs. He studied at the Ecole nationale supérieure de chimie in Rennes and received his doctorate at the École Polytechnique with a dissertation in atomic and plasma physics. From 1990, he then worked at the École Polytechnique for the French National Centre for Scientific Research (CNRS), and from 2004 as Research Director of the Laboratory for Applied Optics (LOA). From 2003 to 2015, he was a professor at the École Polytechnique. He has been a professor at the Weizmann Institute of Science since 2015.

Publications

References 

Living people
1960 births
French physicists
French plasma physicists
People from Casablanca
Fellows of the American Physical Society